Sapphirina darwinii is a species of parasitic copepod.

References

External links 
 

Poecilostomatoida
Crustaceans described in 1864
Taxa named by Ernst Haeckel